William Daniel Brennan (born February 2, 1998) is an American professional baseball outfielder for the Cleveland Guardians of Major League Baseball (MLB). He played college baseball for the Kansas State Wildcats.

Amateur career
Brennan graduated from Blue Valley High School in Overland Park, Kansas. He enrolled at Kansas State University, where he played college baseball for the Kansas State Wildcats for three seasons, from 2017 to 2019. He batted .350 with 64 hits as a freshman and was named second team All-Big 12 Conference and a Freshman All-American by the Collegiate Baseball Newspaper and the National Collegiate Baseball Writers Association. Following the season, Brennan played collegiate summer baseball with the Anchorage Glacier Pilots of the Alaska Baseball League. He was named first team All-Big 12 after batting .359 with 79 hits, 49 runs scored, and 19 stolen bases. During the summer of 2018, he played for the Falmouth Commodores of the Cape Cod Baseball League. Brennan batted .292 as a junior.

Professional career

Minor leagues 
The Cleveland Indians selected Brennan in the eighth round of the 2019 Major League Baseball draft. After signing with the team he was initially assigned to the Arizona League Indians before being promoted to the Class A Short-Season Mahoning Valley Scrappers. After not playing in 2020 due to the cancellation of the minor league season caused by the COVID-19 pandemic, Brennan was assigned to the High-A Lake County Captains at the beginning of the 2021 season. He was promoted to the Double-A Akron RubberDucks after batting .290 in 62 games with Lake County. Brennan began the 2022 season with Akron and was promoted to the Triple-A Columbus Clippers after hitting .304 with 39 RBIs, which was leading the Eastern League.

Major Leagues 
The Guardians selected Brennan's contract on September 21, 2022, adding him to their active roster. He made his major league debut the same day against the Chicago White Sox. Brennan hit his first major home run and triple in the same game off of  Max Castillo. For the season, Brennan hit .357 with 8 RBIs and 1 home run in 42 at bats. 

Due to meeting the requirements of under 130 ABs and under 45 days on the roster (excluding September 1 roster expansion), Brennan is eligible for AL Rookie of the Year in 2023.

References

External links

Kansas State Wildcats bio

1998 births
Living people
Sportspeople from Colorado Springs, Colorado
Baseball players from Colorado
Major League Baseball outfielders
Cleveland Guardians players
Kansas State Wildcats baseball players
Anchorage Glacier Pilots players
Falmouth Commodores players
Arizona League Indians players
Mahoning Valley Scrappers players
Lake County Captains players
Akron RubberDucks players
Columbus Clippers players